Harbour Town Golf Links is a public golf course in the eastern United States, located in South Carolina in Sea Pines Plantation on Hilton Head Island in Beaufort County. Since 1969, it has hosted the RBC Heritage on the PGA Tour, usually in mid-April, the week after The Masters.

Often referred to in the context of the PGA simply as "Hilton Head", Harbour Town Golf Links is ranked high among golf courses in America by Golf Digest and Golf Magazine. The course consists of narrow fairways, overhanging oaks, pines, palmettos, and dark lagoons. Harbour Town, along with the Atlantic Dunes (formerly known as Ocean Course) and Heron Point, make up the Sea Pines Resort.

General information
Harbour Town Golf Links was designed by Pete Dye in 1967 with the help of professional golfer Jack Nicklaus. Dye also designed another course in the Sea Pines Resort, Heron Point, which he redesigned in 2007. The course is open all year, even during overseeding in October and the aerating of the greens in June, July, and August.

Green fees for public play range from $195 to $369, depending on the season. An estimated 38,000 rounds of golf are played at Harbour Town every year.

Grass types
The holes at Harbour Town Golf Links consist of seven different types of grass. Five of the grass types, four of which are Bermudas, are able to withstand the heat during the warm summer months of Hilton Head Island. The other two grass types are annually overseeded in October in order to keep the course green during the cold months. The rye grass that is planted in October is only temporary and will eventually die out when the weather warms up, and the Bermuda grass is no longer dormant. The fairways and rough consist of 419 Bermuda grass.

The tee boxes are made up of Celebration Bermuda as well as TifSports Bermuda. The fairways, rough, and tee boxes are overseeded with rye grass in October. Several tee boxes are composed of Empire Zoysia which does not become dormant (brown) in the winter. These Zoysia tee boxes do not need do be overseeded. Harbour Town Golf Link's greens consist of TifEagle Bermuda which is overseeded with Poa Trivialis in October. The course superintendent, Jonathan Wright, is in charge of maintaining the different types of grass.

Magazine rankings
Golf Digest ranked Harbour Town the 2011-2012 #21 ranked public course in America after previously being ranked #13 in 2010.

PGA Tour professionals rated Harbour Town the #2 ranked golf course played on tour in a survey performed by Golf Digest.

Golf Magazine rates Harbour Town the 2012 #12 rated public course in America. In 2010, it was ranked #14 in the country by Golf Magazine.

Course information

Several holes have a very small margin of error between greens and water hazards (4, 8, 14, 17, 18). Tee shots and lay-ups must be placed in the strategic part of fairway in order to have a direct shot into the green. Sometimes golfers get blocked out by overhanging trees, even if they are in the fairway. Holes in which players may be blocked out from the fairway include numbers 1, 2, 8, 9, 10, 11, 12, 13, 15, and 16. Compared to other courses Harbour Town has high percentage of holes with this challenge.

The ninth hole is a tight par 4 that can be reached from the tee with a long drive. The two finishing holes are along Calibogue Sound, so the water line can vary due to changing tides. The hazard line is permanent, but shots can be played off the sand at low tide. On the final two holes, wind off the water must be factored. The seventeenth hole, a par three, plays southwest and usually into a headwind. The eighteenth is the signature hole and heads northward; its entire left side is guarded by the sound and the right is lined with out of bounds stakes. The red-and-white-striped Harbour Town lighthouse is a backdrop, often a good target for approach shots to the green.

The Heritage Classic
Beginning in 1969, Harbour Town Golf Links has hosted the annual RBC Heritage on the PGA Tour, held in April the weekend following the Masters Tournament. Royal Bank of Canada (RBC) now sponsors the golf tournament after Verizon discontinued their sponsorship of the event following the 2010 event. It is the only PGA Tour event that is annually held in South Carolina. The Ocean Course at Kiawah Island has hosted the PGA Championship twice, won by Rory McIlroy in August 2012 and Phil Mickelson in May 2021.

The inaugural tournament, "The Heritage Golf Classic", was held in late November 1969, with a winner's share of  Forty-year-old Arnold Palmer claimed the first victory in 1969 with 283 (–1) on November 30 for his 55th win on tour, but his first in over  The Heritage Classic, undergoing several different official names, has been held at Harbour Town annually since 1969. The founder of Sea Pines, Charles E. Fraser, started the tradition of the Heritage Classic, and the tournament is always started with a ceremonial tee shot into Calibogue Sound by the defending champion; a cannon is fired simultaneously as the ball is struck.

PGA Tour professionals rated the course #2 in a Golf Digest survey named "Top 10 PGA Tour Courses" in 2012, behind only Augusta National, ranked the world's greatest golf course by Golf Digest.

Harbour Town offers a different sort of challenge than most of the courses played on tour; the course plays differently due to the short yardage and tight fairways. Most courses played on tour are much longer in yardage but have a wider margin of error off the tee and through the green. Strategically placed oaks, pines, and palmettos line and overhang the slim fairways. Professionals will sometimes find themselves having no direct shot to the green even from their own fairway. Tee shots have to be placed on the ideal side of the fairway in order to win the tournament. Another challenging aspect of the course is from the small and slick Bermuda greens. Breaks are subtle and tricky to read as a result of the grain present in the Bermuda grass. Lagoons and inner coastal waterways edge up to the greens forcing players to take more conservative shots.

Winning scores vary considerably from year to year because of the different challenges. Tour players may take advantage of the short yardages and having wedge shots into the greens, but at the same time run the risk of finding themselves in the thick trees with no shot or in a water hazard. Champions now win a prize of over $1.2 million, as well as the traditional tartan plaid jacket.

References

External links

Sea Pines resort official website

Buildings and structures in Beaufort County, South Carolina
Golf clubs and courses in South Carolina
Golf clubs and courses designed by Pete Dye
Tourist attractions in Beaufort County, South Carolina
1967 establishments in South Carolina